Hermann Rappe (20 September 1929 – 30 January 2022) was a German politician and trade unionist who served in the Bundestag from 1972 to 1998. He died on 30 January 2022, at the age of 92.

References

1929 births
2022 deaths
Social Democratic Party of Germany politicians
Bayer people
Members of the Bundestag for Lower Saxony
Commanders Crosses of the Order of Merit of the Federal Republic of Germany
People from Hann. Münden